Peter Polleruhs (28 October 1949 – 17 October 2022) was an Austrian engineer and politician. A member of the Austrian People's Party, he served in the National Council from 1993 to 2002.

Polleruhs died on 17 October 2022, at the age of 72.

References

1949 births
2022 deaths
Austrian People's Party politicians
Members of the National Council (Austria)
People from Kapfenberg